John Brimacombe (born 25 November 1958) is a retired English footballer who played as a full back.

He was playing part-time for Saltash United and combining it with his job at Devonport Dockyard when he was signed by Plymouth Argyle in 1985. He made his debut in January 1986 at the age of 27 and scored one of the club's goals against York City. He enjoyed his best season with the club two years later after succeeding Gordon Nisbet as the club's first choice right back, making 47 appearances during the 1987–88 season. The emergence of Kenny Brown the following season saw Brimacombe move into midfield, but his appearances in the team became more sporadic. He was released in 1990, having made 113 appearances in all competitions for Argyle. He then returned to part-time football.

References

1968 births
Living people
People from Saltash
English footballers
Footballers from Cornwall
Association football defenders
Plymouth Argyle F.C. players
English Football League players
Saltash United F.C. players